The brothers Arkady Natanovich Strugatsky (28 August 1925 – 12 October 1991) and Boris Natanovich Strugatsky (14 April 1933 – 19 November 2012) were Soviet-Russian science-fiction authors who collaborated through most of their careers.

Life and work

The Strugatsky brothers ( or simply ) were born to Natan Strugatsky, an art critic, and his wife, a teacher. Their father was Jewish and their mother was Russian Orthodox. Their early work was influenced by Ivan Yefremov and Stanisław Lem. Later they went on to develop their own, unique style of science fiction writing that emerged from the period of Soviet rationalism in Soviet literature and evolved into novels interpreted as works of social criticism.

Their best-known novel, Piknik na obochine,  has been translated into English as Roadside Picnic.  Andrei Tarkovsky adapted the novel for the screen as Stalker (1979).

Algis Budrys compared their "An Emergency Case" and Arkady's "Wanderers and Travellers" to the work of Eando Binder. Several other of their fiction works were translated into English, German, French, and Italian, but did not receive the same magnitude of critical acclaim as that granted by their Russian audiences. The Strugatsky brothers, however, were and still are popular in many countries, including Estonia, Hungary, Poland, Bulgaria, the former republics of Yugoslavia, and Germany, where most of their works were available in both East and West Germany. They are well-known Russian science fiction writers with a well-developed fan base.

The Strugatsky brothers were Guests of Honour at Conspiracy '87, the 1987 World Science Fiction Convention, held in Brighton, England.

In 1991, Text Publishers brought out the collected works by Arkady and Boris Strugatsky.

Arkady
Arkady Strugatsky was born 25 August 1925 in Batumi; the family later moved to Leningrad. In January 1942, Arkady and his father were evacuated from the Siege of Leningrad, but Arkady was the only survivor in his train car; his father died upon reaching Vologda. Arkady was drafted into the Soviet army in 1943. He trained first at the artillery school in Aktyubinsk and later at the Military Institute of Foreign Languages in Moscow, from which he graduated in 1949 as an interpreter of English and Japanese. He worked as a teacher and interpreter for the military until 1955. In 1955, he began working as an editor and writer. Arkady Strugatsky became a member of the Union of Soviet Writers in 1964. In addition to his own writing, he translated Japanese short stories and novels, as well as some English works with his brother.

Boris

Born 14 April 1933, Boris Strugatsky remained in Leningrad with his mother during the siege of the city during World War II. He graduated from high school in 1950 and applied to the physics department at Leningrad State University, but studied astronomy instead. After graduating in 1955, he worked as an astronomer and computer engineer at the Pulkovo Observatory. In 1960 he participated in a geodetic and astronomical expedition in the Caucasus. Boris Strugatsky became a member of the writers' union of the USSR in 1964. In 1966, he became a full-time writer. From 1972 he acted as the head of the Leningrad seminar of young speculative fiction writers, which subsequently became known as the "Boris Strugatsky Seminar". He established the "Bronze Snail" literary prize. He was an agnostic. After the death of his brother, he published two more novels under a pseudonym.

Noon Universe

Several of the Strugatsky brothers' books take place in the World of Noon, also known unofficially as the Wanderers Universe. The name is derived from the title of one of their texts, Noon: 22nd Century.

The main characteristics of the Noon Universe are: a very high level of social, scientific, and technological development; creativity of the general population; and the very significant level of societal maturity compared to the modern world. For instance, this world knows no monetary stimulation (indeed, money does not exist), and every person is engaged in a profession that interests him or her. The Earth of the Noon Universe is governed by a global meritocratic council composed of the world's leading scientists and philosophers. That Noon World had been clearly named as "World of Communism" in their novels was handy for publishing their novels in the USSR,  where the Communist Party decided whether a book would be printed and approved for mass circulation.

The Noon Universe was described by the authors as the world in which they would like to live and work. It became highly influential for at least a generation of Soviet people, e.g.,  a person could quote the Strugatsky books and be sure of being understood. At first the authors thought the Noon Universe would become reality "by itself", but then they realized that the only way to achieve it was by inventing the High Theory of Upbringing, making the upbringing of each person a unique deed.

One of the important story arcs of those books addresses how the advanced human civilization covertly steers the development of those considered less advanced. Agents of humans are known as Progressors. At the same time, some humans suspect that a very advanced spacefaring race called Wanderers exists and is "progressing" humanity itself.

Works

Novels

Short stories

Short story collections
Short stories originally published in Six Matches:

Short stories originally published as part of the novel Noon: 22nd Century:

Plays

Solo works
The following titles were published by Arkady Strugatsky under the pseudonym S. Yaroslavtsev (C. Ярославцев):

The following titles were published by Boris Strugatsky under the pseudonym S. Vititsky (С. Витицкий):

Adaptations
The Strugatsky's books were often adapted for screen, stage, comics, and video games. Some of the adaptations are very loose, like Tarkovsky's Stalker, some are not adaptations but rather new scripts written by the Brothers themselves, like The Sorcerers.

 Stalker (1979) by Andrey Tarkovsky, based on the Strugatsky's script, inspired by The Roadside Picnic
 Dead Mountaineer's Hotel (1979) by Grigori Kromanov, based on the novel of the same name
 The Sorcerers (1982), by Konstantin Bromberg, based on the Strugatsky's script inspired by Monday Begins on Saturday
 Days of Eclipse (1988) by Alexander Sokurov, inspired by One billion years before the end of the world
 Hard to be a God (1989) by Peter Fleischmann, based on the novel of the same name
 Искушение Б. (Iskushenie B.) (1991) by Arkadi Sirenko, based on the play Five Spoons of Elixir (ru)
 Nesmluvená setkání (1995 Czech TV movie, English: Unexpected Encounters) by Irena Pavlásková, based on the novel Space Mowgli
 The Ugly Swans (2006) by Konstantin Lopushansky, based on the novel of the same name
 Обитаемый остров (2008) is a two-part Russian science fiction film directed by Fyodor Bondarchuk, based on the 1969 novel published in English as Prisoners of Power
 Hard to be a God (2013) by Alexei German, based on the novel of the same name

Legacy
Several writers have to a varying degree paid their tribute to the works of Strugatsky brothers:
 Sergey Lukyanenko in his duology The Stars Are Cold Toys has the main character visit a world that is in many aspects strikingly similar to Earth from the Noon Universe but in truth is revealed to be fundamentally different and oppressive. On his website, Lukyanenko commented that he disagreed with the Strugatskys' views on education and upbringing and conceived his duology partly as a polemic criticism of it.
 The plot of Kir Bulychov's novella from the Alisa Selezneva series, Vacations in Space, or the Planet Five-Four, is based on finding a secret base of mysterious "Wanderers" (Странники), an extinct highly advanced civilization. He also depicted his own Zone in the story Save Galya!
 In late 1990s, a three-volume collection of fiction by notable contemporary Russian science fiction authors, titled The Time of the Apprentices (Время учеников), was published with the endorsement of Boris Strugatsky. Each piece in the collection was a sequel to one of the Strugatskys' books.
 The asteroid 3054 Strugatskia, discovered by Nikolai Stepanovich Chernykh in 1977, was named after the Strugatsky brothers.
 The fictional moon Pandora depicted in the movie Avatar by James Cameron contains some similarities with the Noon Universe series, where a planet is also called Pandora.  Both are filled with jungle, where weird animals and a humanoid race live.  Also, the girlfriend of the biologist Sidorov in the Strugatskys' novel is called "Nava" (as compared with "Na'vi" as the name of the humanoid race in the film).  However, Boris Strugatsky rejected the idea that his works had been plagiarized, despite the similarities.
 In 2014 a square in Saint Petersburg was named after the Strugatsky brothers. A memorial museum is being opened in the same city.
The brothers are credited with saving humanity from mysterious "visitors" through technology retrieved from a "visitation zone" in the 2016 game The Final Station.
 The Polish video game developer Acid Wizard Studio cited the Strugatskys as an influence on their 2017 game Darkwood.
 The designers of the 2019 video game Disco Elysium cited the Strugatskys' writing as an influence on the game's design and writing.
 The video game series S.T.A.L.K.E.R. owes much of its background to the mix of the Strugatsky's writing and the Chernobyl disasters' zone of exclusion.

See also

 List of heroic fictional scientists
 Planets in science fiction

References

External links

 
  Includes the complete works in Russian and selected translations
  Arkady and Boris Strugatsky. The Complete Works
  Stalkers of Russian Science Fiction – the Strugatsky Brothers
  Boris Strugatsky on Avatar at BVI
  Strugatsky Brothers Universe Russian fan site
 Boris Strugatsky on Avatar – English translation by a fan
 Brothers Strugatsky at Russian Sci-Fi (rusf.ru) – includes free library, bibliography of works in translation, much more 
 
 
 
 
 

20th-century Russian translators
20th-century male writers
Russian male novelists
Russian people of Jewish descent
Russian science fiction writers
Russian speculative fiction critics
Russian speculative fiction translators
Sibling duos
Soviet male writers
Soviet novelists
Soviet science fiction writers
Writing duos